Megacraspedus incertellus is a moth of the family Gelechiidae. It was described by Rebel in 1930. It is found in the border region of Bulgaria and Greece.

The forewings are light brownish with a narrow white stripe at the margin.

References

Moths described in 1930
Megacraspedus